Łochów  is a town in the Węgrów County, Masovian Voivodeship, the seat of the urban-rural Gmina Łochów, eastern Poland. In the years 1975-1998 the city administratively belonged to the Siedlce Voivodeship. According to data from 31 December 2005, the city had 6,654 inhabitants. Łochów is located on the banks of the Liwiec River, adjacent to the large Łochów forest.

History

Early history
Łochów has been known since the Middle Ages. The first mention of the town date back to the 14th century. Initially it was a princely settlement on the edge of the Kamieniecka Forest called Łochowiecz.

The interwar period
In 1919, Łochów became the property of the Kurnatowski nobel family as dowry for Isabella Zamoyska. The new owner of Łochów was Eryk Kurnatowski.

External links
 Official town website

Cities and towns in Masovian Voivodeship
Węgrów County